Mon Niye Kachakachi was a Bengali language soap opera which premiered on Star Jalsha on 12 January 2015. The show was produced by Mahendra Soni and Shrikant Mohta under their production company Shree Venkatesh Films. It is the remake of the Hindi show Yeh Hai Mohabbatein which starred Karan Patel and Divyanka Tripathi in the lead roles.

Plot
The story revolves around Labanya Sanyal, a pediatric dentist by profession who is very loving and affectionate by nature. Her biggest pain in life is that she can't conceive a child. She makes up for that void by showering maternal love on all the children who come to her. She is a very optimistic and practical person. Labanya is neighbors with Ranveer, a successful businessman and a single father raising his daughter on his own. His ex-wife Shree left him for his boss and since then Ranveer has made it his mission in life to become very successful. He has also developed a cynical attitude towards women and relationships. In the process he has pushed away the most important person in his life, Muskaan his daughter. Through their encounters, Labanya comes really close to Muskaan and they develop a beautiful bond. Muskaan who misses a mother and feels neglected by her father gains a safe haven within the warm folds of Labanya's affection. Turn of events, then force Ranveer and Labanya to marry each other for Muskaan's sake. Their love for Muskaan forces them to come together into a relationship. Thus the 3 of them become a family and start the journey of knowing and caring for each other. Later on Muskaan's older brother Aditya joins the family and now it's the 4 of them.

Cast

Main cast
Tathagata Mukherjee as Ranveer Rajesh Kapoor
Basabdatta Chatterjee as Dr. Labanya Sanyal Kapoor
Shirdhartri Sarkar as Muskaan Kapoor
Rimjhim Mitra as Shreetama / Shree

Recurring
Sudip Mukherjee as Ashok Chatterjee
 Unknown as Aditya Kapoor- Ranveer and Shreetama's son
Bharat Kaul as Rajesh Kapoor
Sudipa Basu as Mona Kapoor
Maitreyee Mitra / Dolon Roy as Parama Sanyal
Chitra Sen as Labanya's grandmother
Rohit Mukherjee as Pratap Sanyal
Anindya Chatterjee as Ayon Dutta
Poulami Banerjee as Chitrangada / Chitra
Sushmita Dey as Bidisha Mukherjee
Abhijit Deb Roy as Raktim Mukherjee
 Manishankaar Banerjee as Raktim's father
 Unknown as Raktim's mother
 Unknown as Bidisha and Raktim's son
Barna Raha as Gurpreet
 Aninda Pulak Banerjee as Kuljeet- Gurpreet's husband
Debarshi Banerjee as Rocky Kapoor
Alivia Sarkar as Jyoti Kapoor
Dwaipayan Das as Koushik Roy Chowdhury
Koushani Roy as Somdatta

Guest appearances
Hiran Chatterjee as himself came to promote his flim jamai 420
Payel Sarkar as herself came to promote her flim Jamai 420

References

Indian television series
Bengali-language television programming in India
2015 Indian television series debuts
2015 Indian television series endings
Star Jalsha original programming